Alan Knight (born 16 March 1936) is a former Australian rules footballer who played for the South Melbourne Football Club in the Victorian Football League (VFL).

Notes

External links 

Living people
1936 births
Australian rules footballers from Victoria (Australia)
Sydney Swans players